"Come On, Come In" is a song by American hard rock band Velvet Revolver," featured on the soundtrack to the 2005 superhero film Fantastic Four. When released as a promotional single in the United States on June 21, 2005, the song reached number 14 on the American Billboard Hot Mainstream Rock Tracks chart. The lyrics were written by vocalist Scott Weiland and the music was written by Weiland and the rest of the band; the song was produced by the band, Douglas Grean and Nick Raskulinecz. The music video for "Come On, Come In" was directed by Wayne Isham and is featured as an extra in the Fantastic Four DVD.

Track listing
"Come On, Come In" - 3:50

Personnel
Velvet Revolver
Scott Weiland – vocals, production
Slash – lead guitar, production
Duff McKagan – bass, production
Matt Sorum – drums, production
Dave Kushner – rhythm guitar, production
Additional personnel
Douglas Grean – production
Nick Raskulinecz – production
Mike Brown – vocals engineering
Dave Donnelly – mastering

References

2005 songs
2005 singles
Fantastic Four (film series)
Song recordings produced by Nick Raskulinecz
Songs written by Dave Kushner
Songs written by Duff McKagan
Songs written by Matt Sorum
Songs written by Scott Weiland
Songs written by Slash (musician)
Velvet Revolver songs
Wind-up Records singles